The 2006 Big Ten softball tournament was held at Sharon J. Drysdale Field on the campus of Northwestern University in Evanston, Illinois from May 12 through May 13, 2006. As the tournament winner, Michigan earned the Big Ten Conference's automatic bid to the 2006 NCAA Division I softball tournament.

Format and seeding
The 2006 tournament was an eight team single-elimination tournament. The top eight teams based on conference regular season winning percentage earned invites to the tournament.

Tournament

Schedule

All-Tournament Team
 Designated Player: Tiffany Worthy (Michigan)
 Utility Player: Mariangee Bogado (Indiana)
 Pitcher: Courtnay Foster (Northwestern)
 Pitcher: Jennie Ritter (Michigan)
 Catcher: Becky Marx (Michigan)
 First base: Samantha Findlay (Michigan)
 Second base: Tiffany Haas (Michigan)
 Third base: Darcy Sengewald (Northwestern)
 Shortstop: Tammy Williams (Northwestern)
 Outfielder: Rebekah Milian (Michigan)
 Outfielder: Megan Schwab (Ohio State)
 Outfielder: Brittany Vanderink (Ohio State)

Tournament MVP
 Jennie Ritter (Michigan)

References

Big Ten softball tournament
Tournament
Big Ten softball tournament